Thai money bag ( (thung thong) – 'golden bags') is a traditional Thai savory appetizer. They are part of the Thai royal cuisine.

People usually give thung thong during the New Year festival to wish each other money or gold. In the past, they used to be served on occasions such as weddings, but nowadays thung thong is more likely to be served at luxurious parties or Chinese banquets.

Ingredients 
The ingredients include:

 Wrapper
 Medium-sized shrimps, cleaned, shelled and deveined
 Minced Pork
 Chestnuts, cut into small cubes
Shitake mushroom, cut into small cubes
 Sugar
 Coriander root, finely chopped
 Minced garlic
 Fish sauce
 Soy sauce
Garlic chives, scald in hot water and slice into a thin line for binding wonton wrappers
 Sweet plum sauce or sweet chilli sauce (for dipping)

References

External links 
 
 
 Thai Money bag

Thai desserts and snacks